Everything All the Time is the debut album of indie rock band Band of Horses and was released on March 21, 2006, on Sub Pop Records. It features new versions of five of the six songs from the band's Tour EP, some with different titles. The album is the only one to feature original band members Mat Brooke, Chris Early and Tim Meinig.

History
Everything All the Time features the band's original four-piece lineup, although both Tim Meinig and Sera Cahoone receive drumming credits. The band recorded this album in the heart of Seattle for Sub Pop Records. Discussing the album's sound, band leader Ben Bridwell said, "I thought before recording that I really wanted an ELO-sounding record, with strings and keyboards and synths, but then, as we got closer to it, we wanted to take a more raw approach." Regarding its lyrics, he added, "A lot of these songs didn't really come from any lyric writing, let alone any singing ability. A lot of the ways the words are sung were meant to hide or mask what's being said. But there are definitely words. I wrote 'em down on paper and everything."

The band performed the first single from the album, "The Funeral", on the Late Show with David Letterman. By that time Brooke, Meinig and Early had all left the band and had been replaced by Joe Arnone (keyboards, guitar), Rob Hampton (guitar, bass) and Creighton Barrett (drums). "The Funeral" has been used extensively in film, TV, video games and advertisements.

The two tracks with lyrics written by Mat Brooke, "I Go to the Barn..." and "St. Augustine" feature co-lead vocals by Brooke and Bridwell although Brooke's vocals are much quieter than Bridwell's. A demo version of "I Go to the Barn..." titled "I'd Like to Think" was recorded by Brooke and Bridwell as Nov 16, a short lived project between Carissa's Wierd and Band of Horses. On the Nov 16 version, Bridwell's vocals are much quieter than Brooke's. Neither "I Go to the Barn..." nor "St. Augustine" were played live after Brooke's 2006 departure from the band until December 2012, when both songs reappeared in their live setlist.

The album was a minor hit in Scandinavia, appearing in the lower reaches of both the Swedish and Norwegian album charts.

Reception

The album was generally well received by critics. It has a score of 78 out of 100 from 24 critics on the website Metacritic. Pitchfork placed Everything All the Time at number 109 on their list of top 200 albums of the 2000s.

Track listing

All songs written by Band of Horses, lyrics by Bridwell, except 8 & 10 lyrics by Brooke.

Personnel
Ben Bridwell - Vocals, electric guitar (2,4,6,7), pedal steel (1,8,9), bass (3), piano (2)
Mat Brooke - Electric guitar (1,2,4,6,7,9), acoustic guitar (4-6,8-10), vocals (8,10), banjo (9), e-bow (4)
Chris Early - Bass guitar (1-9)
Tim Meinig - Drums (1,4,6,7) 
Sera Cahoone - Drums (2,3,5)

Chart performance

Certifications and sales

References

2006 debut albums
Band of Horses albums
Sub Pop albums
Albums produced by Phil Ek